Western hog-nosed viper may refer to:

 Heterodon nasicus, a.k.a. the western hog-nosed snake, a harmless colubrid species found in the United States
 Porthidium ophryomegas, a.k.a. the slender hognosed pitviper, a venomous pitviper species found in Central America

Animal common name disambiguation pages